In West Africa,  garri (also known as gari, galli, or gali)  is the flour of the fresh starchy cassava root. 

In the Hausa language, garri can also refer to the flour of guinea corn, maize, rice, yam, plantain and millet. For example, garin dawa is processed from guinea corn, garin masara and garin alkama originate from maize and wheat respectively, while garin magani is a powdery medicine. 

Starchy flours mixed with cold or boiled water form a major part of the diet in Nigeria, Benin, Togo, Ghana, Guinea, Cameroon and Liberia.

Cassava, the root from which garri is produced, is rich in fiber, copper and magnesium.

Garri is similar to farofa of Brazil, used in many food preparations and recipes, particularly in the state of Bahia.

Preparation

To make garri flour, cassava tubers are peeled, washed and grated or crushed to produce a mash. The mash can be mixed with palm oil and placed in a porous bag, which is then placed in an adjustable press machine for 1–3 hours to remove excess water. Once dried, it is then sieved and fried in a large clay frying pot with or without palm oil. The resulting dry granular garri can be stored for long periods. It may be pounded or ground to make a fine flour. Garri comes in various consistencies, including rough, medium and smooth, which are used to prepare different foods.

Dishes 
Eba is a stiff dough made by soaking garri in hot water and kneading it with a wooden baton until it becomes a smooth doughy staple. It is served as part of a meal with soups and sauces. Some of these include okra soup, egusi soup, vegetable soup, afang soup, banga soup and bitter leaf soup. Similar starchy doughs are found as staples in other African cuisines.

Kokoro is a Nigerian snack food common in southern and southeast Nigeria, especially Abia State, Rivers State, Anambra State, Enugu State and Imo State. It is made from a paste of maize flour, mixed with garri and sugar and deep-fried.

As a snack, cereal, or light meal, garri can be soaked in cold water (in which case it settles to the bottom), mixed with sugar or honey, and sometimes roasted peanuts and/or evaporated milk, also known as garri soakings. The amount of water needed for soaked garri is 3:1. Garri can also be eaten dry with sugar and roasted peanut. Other ingredients include coconut chunks, tiger nut milk, and cashews.

In Liberia, garri is used to make a dessert called kanyan which is combined with peanuts and honey.

In its dry form, garri is used as an accompaniment for soft cooked beans and palm oil. This food mix is called yoo ke garri, or garri-fɔtɔ/galli-fɔtɔ (crushed garri) in the Ga language of Ghana and the Gen dialect of southern Togo and Benin. This type of garri is a mixture of moistened garri kneaded with a thickened tomato paste, oil, salt, seasonings. Yoo ke garri is garri with beans, which is typically eaten as lunch. It is also eaten with bean cake in Nigeria.

Smooth garri (known as lebu to the Yoruba) can be mixed with pepper and other spicy ingredients. A small amount of warm water and palm oil is added and softened by hand. This type of garri is served with fried fish. It is served with frejon on Good Friday.

Variations
In West Africa, two types of garri include white and yellow garri. Yellow garri is prepared by adding palm oil just before the fermenting stage of the cassava mash. Alternatively, it can be made using the yellow-fleshed breed of cassava. White garri on the other hand is fried without palm oil.

Variations of yellow and white garri are common across Nigeria and Cameroon. One variation of white garri is popularly known as garri-Ijebu. This is produced mainly by the Yoruba people of Ijebu in Nigeria.

In Ghana, garri is classified by taste and grain size. The sweeter types with finer grains are more valued over sourer, large grain varieties. Commercial food vendors prefer coarser grains with high starch content, as this produces a greater yield when soaked in water.

Buyers often look out for crisper grains when trying to determine freshness.

See also

 African cuisine
 Similar cassava-based dishes 
 Farofa
 Fufu
 Ugali
 Ogi (food)
 Poi
 List of African dishes
 Tapai

References

External links

Gari on Ghanaweb.com
 Igbo guide on garri

Ghanaian cuisine
Nigerian cuisine
Igbo cuisine
Cameroonian cuisine
Fermented foods
Staple foods
Sierra Leonean cuisine
Yoruba cuisine
Liberian cuisine
Cassava dishes